The 2015 888.com World Grand Prix was a professional non-ranking snooker tournament that took place between 16 and 22 March 2015 at the Venue Cymru in Llandudno, Wales.

Judd Trump won the inaugural event by defeating Ronnie O'Sullivan 10–7 in the final.

Prize fund
The breakdown of prize money for this year is shown below:

Winner: £100,000
Runner-up: £35,000
Semi-final: £20,000
Quarter-final: £10,000
Last 16: £5,000
Last 32: £2,500

Highest break: £5,000
Total: £300,000

Seeding list
The top 32 players on a one-year ranking system running from the 2014 World Snooker Championship to the 2015 Gdynia Open qualified for the tournament.

Main draw

Final

Century breaks
Total: 17
 142, 140, 121  Judd Trump
 139  Joe Perry
 136  Peter Ebdon
 122, 108, 106  Stephen Maguire
 121  Neil Robertson
 115  Rod Lawler
 113, 111  Martin Gould
 110  Mark Selby
 109, 102  Mark Davis
 105  Ronnie O'Sullivan
 101  Stuart Bingham

References

World Grand Prix (snooker)
World Grand Prix, 2015
World Grand Prix
World Grand Prix
Snooker competitions in Wales
Llandudno